The University of Connecticut (UConn) Huskies football team has had 43 players selected in the National Football League (NFL) Draft.  Two of those selections were in the first round of the draft, both with the 27th overall pick: running back Donald Brown in 2009 and cornerback Byron Jones in 2015. A Connecticut football alumnus had been selected in every NFL draft from 2007 to 2015 and in fourteen of the last eighteen NFL drafts.

Each NFL franchise seeks to add new players through the annual NFL draft. The draft rules were last updated in 2009. The team with the worst record the previous year picks first, the next-worst team second, and so on. Teams that did not make the playoffs are ordered by their regular-season record with any remaining ties broken by strength of schedule. Playoff participants are sequenced after non-playoff teams, based on their round of elimination (wild card, division, conference, and Super Bowl).

Before the merger agreements in 1966, the American Football League (AFL) operated in direct competition with the NFL and held a separate draft. This led to a bidding war over top prospects between the two leagues. As part of the merger agreement on June 8, 1966, the two leagues would hold a multiple round "common draft". Once the AFL officially merged with the NFL in 1970, the "common draft" simply became the NFL draft.

The first Connecticut player to be taken in the NFL draft was Walt Trojanowski in the sixth round of the 1946 NFL draft.  From 1946–1994, the Huskies had fourteen players drafted into the NFL over the span of forty-eight years.  The rate at which UConn alumni were selected would significantly increase following the Huskies' upgrade from Division I-AA to Division I-A in 2000.  Beginning in 2005 and continuing through 2015, Connecticut has had twenty-five players picked over eleven NFL drafts.  In 2009 four UConn alumni were taken in the first two rounds of the draft.  The most Connecticut players to be selected in a single NFL draft was five in 2013, including three in the third round, one in the fourth round, and one in the sixth round.

Key

Selections

American Football League

National Football League

Notes

References
General

Specific

UConn

UConn Huskies NFL draft